Lee Soo-min (born July 1, 2001) is a South Korean actress. In 2014, she became a co-host of Tok! Tok! Boni, Hani.

Filmography

Film

Television series

Web series

Variety show

Awards and nominations

References

External links

2001 births
Living people
South Korean child actresses
South Korean television actresses
South Korean musical theatre actresses
South Korean television presenters
South Korean women television presenters
21st-century South Korean actresses
People from Ulsan